Melloconcha miranda, also known as the Miranda's glass-snail, is a species of land snail that is endemic to Australia's Lord Howe Island in the Tasman Sea.

Taxonomy
The species is sometimes placed in the monotypic genus Annacharis because of its distinctive channelled sutures.

Description
The discoidal shell of the mature snail is 3.7 mm in height, with a diameter of 6.7 mm, and a low spire. It is smooth, glossy and pale golden in colour The whorls are rounded, with deeply channelled sutures and finely incised spiral grooves. It has an ovately lunate aperture and closed umbilicus. The animal is unknown.

Distribution and habitat
The snail is only known from a single empty shell collected from the summit of Mount Gower in 1913. It is evidently very rare and may be extinct.

References

 
 

 
miranda
Gastropods of Lord Howe Island
Taxa named by Tom Iredale
Gastropods described in 1944
Species known from a single specimen